A tract is a literary work and, in current usage, usually religious in nature. The notion of what constitutes a tract has changed over time.  By the early part of the 21st century, a tract referred to a brief pamphlet used for religious and political purposes, though far more often the former.  Tracts are often either left for someone to find or handed out.  However, there have been times in history when the term implied tome-like works. A tractate, a derivative of a tract, is equivalent in Hebrew literature to a chapter of the Christian Bible.

History
The distribution of tracts pre-dates the development of the printing press, with the term being applied by scholars to religious and political works at least as early as the 7th century. They were used to disseminate the teachings of John Wycliffe in the 14th century. As a political tool, they proliferated throughout Europe during the 17th century. They have been printed as persuasive religious material since the invention of Gutenberg's printing press, being widely utilized by Martin Luther during the start of the Lutheran movement of Christianity.

Religious tracts
In the 7th century AD, nearly all Christian apologetic tracts published in Syriac and Arabic explicated the reason that Christians prayed facing the east is because "the Garden of Eden was planted in the east and that at the end of time, at the second coming, the Messiah would approach Jerusalem from the east." (cf. Ad orientem)

As religious literature, tracts were used throughout the turbulence of the Protestant Reformation and the various upheavals of the 17th century. They came to such prominence again in the Oxford Movement for reform within the Church of England that the movement became known as "Tractarianism", after the publication in the 1830s and 1840s of a series of religious essays collectively called Tracts for the Times.

These tracts were written by a group of Anglican clergy including John Henry Newman, John Keble, Henry Edward Manning, and Edward Pusey. They were theological discourses that sought to establish the continuity between the Church of England and the patristic period of church history. They had a vast influence on Anglo-Catholicism. They were learned works and varied in length from four to over 400 pages. An important center for the spreading of tracts was the London-based Religious Tract Society. Tracts were used both within England, affecting the conversion of pioneer missionary to China, Hudson Taylor, as well as in the crosscultural missions that movements such as Taylor founded: the China Inland Mission.

Charles Spurgeon wrote many tracts, and in addition to these evangelical writings, his "Penny Sermons" were printed weekly and distributed widely by the millions and used in a similar way, and they still are today. In America, the American Tract Society distributed vast quantities of tracts in multitudes of languages to newly arriving immigrants at Ellis Island and sought to assist them in their struggles in their new country.

The publishing of tracts for religious purposes has continued unabated, with many Christian tract ministries, in particular, existing today. In the United States, the American Tract Society has continuously published literature of this type since 1825; around Allhallowtide, around 3 million alone are purchased annually to be distributed by Christians. 

By the late 19th century, Bible Students associated with Zion's Watch Tower Tract Society were distributing tens of millions of tracts each year; by the start of World War I, they had distributed hundreds of millions of tracts in dozens of languages worldwide. The Watch Tower Society continues to publish hundreds of millions of religious tracts in more than 400 languages, which are distributed by Jehovah's Witnesses.

As evangelistic tools, tracts became prominent in the Jesus movement. One of the most widely distributed, and one that continues to be handed out en masse, is "The Four Spiritual Laws" authored by Bill Bright of Campus Crusade for Christ and first published in 1965. "This Was Your Life" was the first of many tracts written by Jack Chick. Later Chick tracts followed the pattern of vivid cartoon images.

In the 1980s and 1990s, Last Days Ministries reprinted articles in the Last Days Newsletter by Keith Green and other contemporary and historic writers including David Wilkerson, Leonard Ravenhill, Winkie Pratney, Charles Finney, John Wesley, and William Booth. More recently Living Waters Publications prints tracts such as "The Atheist Test" or "Are You Good Enough to Go to Heaven?", as well as tracts which feature attention-getting illusions or gags. These include the "Million Dollar Bill", which caused a legal controversy in June 2006. Most Christian tract ministries operate as non-profit "faith" organizations, some to the degree that they do not require a fee for their tracts. One of the most productive among these is Fellowship Tract League, which has printed over 4 billion Gospel tracts since 1978, available in over 70 different languages, and  have been distributed into more than 200 countries.

In the 2010s, Saint Paul Street Evangelization, a Roman Catholic apostolate focused on evangelism, has published tracts for distribution especially while engaged in street ministry.

Tracts are widely used in Methodist tradition, being  published by apostolates such as the Pilgrim Tract Society.

"Tracting" is a colloquialism commonly used by missionaries for the Church of Jesus Christ of Latter-day Saints to refer to door-to-door proselytizing, whether or not actual tracts are dispensed.

Political tracts

Brochure-like tracts, also known as pamphlets, advocating political positions have also been used throughout history as well. They were used throughout Europe in the 17th century. In the 18th century, they featured prominently in the political unrest leading up to the American Revolution, and in the English response to the French Revolution, a "pamphlet war" known as the Revolution Controversy. A well-known example of a far-reaching tract from this era is Common Sense by Thomas Paine.

Tracts were used for political purposes throughout the 20th century. They were used to spread Nazi propaganda in central Europe during the 1930s and 1940s. According to Jack Chick, his impetus to design cartoon-based religious tracts was brought on by hearing of a similar promotional tool used by Communists in China to wide success.  In the months before the John F. Kennedy assassination, Lee Harvey Oswald handed out pamphlets promoting Fidel Castro and Communist Cuba on the streets of New Orleans, Louisiana.

See also

References

Activism by type
Books by type
Documents
Ephemera
Religious literature